This is a list of candidates of the 1956 New South Wales state election. The election was held on 3 March 1956.

Retiring Members

Labor
 Robert Cameron (Waratah)
 Daniel Clyne (King)
 Edgar Dring (Auburn) died in December 1955; no by-election was held due to the proximity of the election.
 Arthur Williams (East Hills)

Liberal
 Walter Howarth (Maitland)
 Joseph Jackson (Nepean)

Legislative Assembly
Sitting members are shown in bold text. Successful candidates are highlighted in the relevant colour.

See also
 Members of the New South Wales Legislative Assembly, 1956–1959

References

1956